Magnús Guðmundsson (6 February 1879 – 28 November 1937) was an Icelandic politician. He graduated in laws from the University of Copenhagen in 1907. Magnus was a member of Althingi for his constituency in North west Iceland from 1916 till the day of his death in 1937. He served as prime minister of Iceland from 23 June to 8 July 1926, and was a member of the now defunct Conservative Party (Íhaldsflokkurinn). He was the Minister of Industrial Affairs in the presiding Government of Jón Magnússon from 1924 to 1927. Prior to that he had served as Minister of Finance of Iceland from 1920 to 1922. He was a founding member of the Independence Party and served as a minister of Justice in the first government that the Independence Party participated in, from 1932 to 1934.

References

1879 births
1937 deaths
Magnus Gudmundsson
Finance ministers of Iceland
Magnus Gudmundsson
Magnus Gudmundsson